Life Is Good is the first country music album by American Tejano music artist Emilio Navaira. It was released by Capitol Nashville on September 26, 1995. Its first single, "It's Not the End of the World," reached the Top 30 on the Billboard Hot Country Singles & Tracks chart. The album peaked at #13 on the Top Country Albums chart and #82 on the Billboard 200.

Track listing

ASpanish adaptation by Marco Flores.

Personnel
 Eddie Bayers - drums
 Barry Beckett - keyboards
 Bruce Bouton - steel guitar
 Larry Byrom - acoustic guitar
 Paul Franklin - steel guitar
 Terry McMillan - percussion
 Phil Naish - keyboards
 Louis Nunley - backing vocals
 Bobby Ogdin - keyboards
 Don Potter - acoustic guitar
 Michael Rhodes - bass
 Brent Rowan - electric guitar
 John Wesley Ryles - backing vocals
 Joe Spivey - fiddle
 Dennis Wilson - backing vocals
 Pete Ybarra - accordion
 Curtis Young - backing vocals

Chart performance

References

External links
[ Life Is Good] at Allmusic

1995 albums
Emilio Navaira albums
Albums produced by Barry Beckett
Capitol Records albums